Mithyuê de Souza Linhares (born October 16, 1989 in Chapecó, Santa Catarina) or simply Mithyuê, is a Brazilian retired footballer and a current futsal player, who plays for Jaén Paraíso Interior FS. He is the cousin of fellow futsal player Sérgio Jamur.

Career

Futsal career

Mithyuê was born in Chapecó, and started to play futsal at the age of six. He became a professional when he turned 17, playing for Joinville in Liga Futsal. He soon became well known in Brazil as the successor of Falcão, the best futsal player in the world. Mithyuê lead his team to a league runner-up campaign, scoring 13 goals, and was named rookie of the year and the best flanks position player, alongside Falcão. Also in 2007, he earned his first cap for the Brazil national futsal team, at age of 17, making him one of the youngest players ever to receive a cap. In the 2008 edition of Liga Futsal, he scored eight goals and JEC earned a 7th place.

Moving to football

Grêmio

In May 2008, Mithyuê was invited for the retired Brazil international midfielder Paulo César Carpegiani to make a trial in football for Grêmio. He accepted the challenge and signed 3-month trial deal to play for the youth team. Mithyuê's rising in football lead the club to extend his contract and he is expected to play for the first team in 2009.

In May 2012, claiming lack of opportunities, Mithyuê decided to switch back to futsal and is looking for a friendly termination of his contract with Grêmio.

References

External links
 Profile

1989 births
Living people
Brazilian men's futsal players
Brazilian footballers
Grêmio Foot-Ball Porto Alegrense players
Club Athletico Paranaense players
Esporte Clube Juventude players
Association football midfielders
People from Chapecó
Sportspeople from Santa Catarina (state)